John Connor (July 1861 – November 24, 1905) was an American Major League Baseball player who pitched a total of 12 games over the course of his two-season career.  He had a win–loss record of 2–8 and a 3.81 earned run average in 104 innings pitched.  He began his career with the Boston Beaneaters for the  season, later playing for both the Buffalo Bisons and the Louisville Colonels during the  season.  On August 29, 1885, Connor was traded by Louisville to the Chattanooga, Tennessee team of the Southern League for Toad Ramsey.  Connor died at the age of 44 in his hometown of Nashua, New Hampshire, and is interred at St. Patrick Cemetery in Hudson, New Hampshire.

References

External links

1861 births
1905 deaths
Baseball players from New Hampshire
Major League Baseball pitchers
Boston Beaneaters players
Buffalo Bisons (NL) players
Louisville Colonels players
Sportspeople from Nashua, New Hampshire
Boston Reserves players
Chattanooga Lookouts players
Brockton (minor league baseball) players
19th-century baseball players